United Nations Security Council Resolution 1732, adopted unanimously on December 21, 2006, after welcoming a report by a working group established by the Security Council, the Council took note of its findings and decided that it had fulfilled its mandate.

Details
The mandate of the working group was to make recommendations on how to improve the effectiveness of United Nations sanctions. It was also tasked with addressing unintended consequences of sanctions, the enforcement of sanctions and de-listing procedures. Subsidiary bodies were requested to take note of the findings of the working group.

See also
 List of United Nations Security Council Resolutions 1701 to 1800 (2006–2008)

References

External links
 
Text of the Resolution at undocs.org

 1732
December 2006 events